Du Feng (born July 30, 1981 in Ürümqi, Xinjiang) is a Chinese professional basketball coach and former player.

He is the current head coach of China's national team and also head coach of his longtime club, the Guangdong Southern Tigers. 

At a height of 2.07 meters (6' 9"), and a weight of 100 kilograms (220 pounds), he played as a power forward-center.

Playing career

Professional
Du was the Chinese Basketball Association (CBA) Finals MVP in 2004 with the Guangdong Southern Tigers, a team based in Dongguan, Guangdong, where he completed his career and retired from competition at the close of the 2011-12 CBA season.

National team
Du competed at the 2004 Summer Olympics and 2008 Summer Olympics with the Chinese men's national basketball team (Team China). He also helped China finish with silver medals at the 2002 Asian Games and the 2009 FIBA Asia Championship.

Coaching career

Professional
Du started his coaching career as an assistant to Li Chunjiang at Guangdong in the 2012-13 CBA season, but moved into the head coaching spot on an interim basis when Li resigned in January, after nearly 13 years leading the Southern Tigers. The team went on to win their record-tying eighth title in the 2013 CBA Finals with Du being named head coach on a permanent basis as a result of that success. Guangdong did not return to the championship round again until the 2017 CBA Finals when they lost to the Xinjiang Flying Tigers.

National team
In April 2017, it was revealed that Du was appointed as the head coach of one of the two Chinese national basketball teams formed by the Chinese Basketball Association, in preparation for the 2019 FIBA Basketball World Cup and 2020 Summer Olympics. Du was assigned to coach the China Blue team while Li Nan would mentor the China Red team. In September 2018, Li Nan was announced as the head coach of China's reunified national team, while Du would return to his previous job with the Guangdong Southern Tigers.

Du was selected as head coach of China's squad for the 2023 FIBA Basketball World Cup qualification.

References

External links 
 Player profile at www.Asia-Basket.com

1981 births
Living people
Centers (basketball)
Guangdong Southern Tigers players
Power forwards (basketball)
Basketball players from Xinjiang
People from Ürümqi
Chinese men's basketball players
Olympic basketball players of China
Basketball players at the 2008 Summer Olympics
Asian Games medalists in basketball
Asian Games silver medalists for China
Basketball players at the 2002 Asian Games
Medalists at the 2002 Asian Games
Hui sportspeople
2006 FIBA World Championship players
2002 FIBA World Championship players